The discography of Japanese musician Yuna Ito consists of three studio albums, one compilation album and nineteen singles. Her debut album, Heart, was released in 2007 after six singles, including one of the two theme songs for the film Nana, "Endless Story" (2005), which also featured Ito in her acting debut, as well as "Precious" (2006), the theme song of the film Limit of Love: Umizaru. Both of these songs were very commercially successful, becoming certified Million by the RIAJ.

In 2008, Ito released her second album Wish, followed by Dream in 2009. After releasing a further two singles, Ito released her final album, Love: Singles Best 2005–2010, an album compiling her singles released between 2006 and 2010.

Studio albums

Compilation albums

Singles

As a lead artist

As a featured artist

Promotional singles

Other appearances

Notes

References

Discographies of American artists
Discographies of Japanese artists
Pop music discographies